Flawless Shade is the stage name of Tajh Jordan (sometimes Tajh Patterson), an American drag queen and make-up artist based in Portland, Oregon. A former Miss Gay Oregon, Flawless Shade has been featured in campaigns by Adidas, GLAAD, and Top Level Design. Jordan competed under their real name on the subscription-based streaming service WOW Presents Plus's competition series Painted with Raven.

Career
Tajh Jordan is a make-up artist based in Portland, Oregon, who performs in drag as Flawless Shade. In 2016, Flawless Shade was the first drag competitor in the Stoli Key West Cocktail Classic, an annual bartending contest featuring 15 LGBT bartenders from North America, in which she placed third. As of 2017–2018, at Portland's Century Bar, Flawless Shade hosted a twice-weekly bingo event "Flawless Bingo", which served as a fundraiser for organizations including Cascade AIDS Project.

Flawless Shade hosted drag shows at CC Slaughters, karaoke at Capitol Bar, and trivia at Victoria Bar as of 2019. She also hosted bingo at "Thursgays", a monthly LGBT meetup at the arcade-game and pinball venue Quarterworld. She is one of six young queer influencers who featured in Adidas's 2019 gay pride advertising campaign and was named Miss Gay Oregon 2020, one of few Black  winners of that pageant title to date. During her reign, Flawless Shade felt discriminated against, resulting in her resignation and reinstatement. According to Andrew Jankowski of Portland Mercury, complaints from her and others prompted the International Sovereign Rose Court "to examine its own inclusivity efforts".

In 2020, during the COVID-19 pandemic, Flawless Shade curated the Portland Pride event "Support Your Queer Black Entertainers", a series of video testimonials featuring local Black queer performers that raised $2,000 for the featured entertainers. She also participated in Portland Pride's event "Introvert: Digital Drag Show", which was described as a "night of socially distant drag". Flawless Shade was featured in The Library, a web series featuring queer Portlanders that was presented by Logan Lynn and Top Level Design for the top-level domain name .gay. She represented Oregon in GLAAD's video, which featured drag queens from all 50 states and Washington, D.C., and sought to mobilize voters in the 2020 U.S. presidential election. Flawless Shade hosted and performed at Botanist House's drag show as of 2021. She also co-hosted a tea dance for Portland Pride and performed at Seattle's PrideFest in 2021.

Under his real name, Jordan competed on the first season of Painted with Raven, subscription-based streaming service WOW Presents Plus's cosmetics competition series featuring Raven that debuted in late 2021.

Personal life
Jordan is Black and queer. He lives in Portland and has described himself as a "Black gay genderfluid person who is a drag queen". In 2017, Jordan called police and filmed a man who was harassing patrons at Scandals, a gay bar in Portland. As of 2021, Flawless Shade is a member of House of Shade.

Filmography

Television
 Painted with Raven (season 1; 2021–2022)

See also

 LGBT culture in Portland, Oregon
 List of drag queens
 List of LGBT African Americans
 List of LGBT people from Portland, Oregon

References

External links
 

Year of birth missing (living people)
Living people
African-American drag queens
African-American history of Oregon
American make-up artists
Gay entertainers
Genderfluid people
People with non-binary gender identities
LGBT African Americans
LGBT people from Oregon
Non-binary drag performers
Painted with Raven
People from Portland, Oregon